Andy Murray defeated Tommy Robredo in the final, 5–7, 7–6(11–9), 6–1 to win the inaugural singles tennis title at the 2014 ATP Shenzhen Open. He saved five championship points en route to the title, in the second set.

Seeds
The top four seeds receive a bye into the second round.

Draw

Finals

Top half

Bottom half

Qualifying

Seeds

Qualifiers

Qualifying draw

First qualifier

Second qualifier

Third qualifier

Fourth qualifier

References
 Main Draw
 Qualifying Draw

ATP Shenzhen Open - Singles
2014 Singles